Olaf Renn (born 12 October 1969) is a German former footballer.

Renn made 275 appearances in the 2. Fußball-Bundesliga during his playing career.

References

External links 
 

1969 births
Living people
German footballers
East German footballers
Association football midfielders
2. Bundesliga players
Chemnitzer FC players
SC Fortuna Köln players
FC Energie Cottbus players
1. FC Lokomotive Leipzig players
Sportspeople from Chemnitz
VfB Fortuna Chemnitz players
Footballers from Saxony